30 Commando Information Exploitation Group RM is a battalion-sized unit of the Royal Marines and forms part of 3 Commando Brigade. The unit resources include communications, information operations, information systems, intelligence, surveillance, and Target Acquisition and Reconnaissance (ISTAR).

History
The group's title harks back to the original 30 Commando (which in turn became 30 Assault Unit RM), formed in 1942. This unit was tasked to move ahead of advancing Allied forces, or to undertake covert infiltrations into enemy territory by land, sea or air, to capture much needed intelligence, in the form of codes, documents, equipment or enemy personnel.

In 2000, the United Kingdom Landing Force Command Support Group (UKLF CSG) was formed from 3 Commando Brigade's Headquarters and Signals Squadron.

In March 2010, the UKLF CSG was renamed the 30 Commando Information Exploitation Group.

In 2013, the group was granted the freedom of Littlehampton, West Sussex, in honour of the original unit being based in the town during the Second World War.

Structure

The group comprises:

 Headquarters Squadron, including the Intelligence and Information Activities Cells
 Surveillance and Reconnaissance Squadron
 Brigade Patrol Troop
 Shore Reconnaissance Team
 Y Squadron - Electronic Warfare
 Air Defence Troop - using Starstreak high-velocity missile
 Information Activities Cell - Information Operations and Combat Camera Team (CCT)
 Communications Squadron
 Logistics Squadron
 Motor Transportation Troop
 Royal Marines Police Troop - protect key personnel such as visiting dignitaries and foreign officials. They also provide training and assistance to police forces around the world.
 Catering Troop
 Stores Troop
 Equipment Support Troop
 Base Squadron - looks after Royal Marines Barracks Stonehouse, much of which was built in the 1700s. It is responsible for providing real-life support, such as dining facilities, accommodation, medical care, rehabilitation of injured personnel and physical training facilities.

References

External links

 Official website
30 Commando Assault Unit - Ian Fleming's 'Red Indians' - Literary James Bond's Wartime Unit

2000 establishments in the United Kingdom
Royal Marine formations and units
Military units and formations established in 2000